Buchanstone railway station is a former railway station in Aberdeenshire. On the Great North of Scotland Railway, the station was on the north side of the track. It was opened in November 1854 and closed to passenger traffic in September 1866. The building was demolished before 1901 and nothing visible remains. The railway line is still in use as the Aberdeen to Inverness Line.

Previous services

References

Notes

Sources

External links
 RAILSCOT on Great North of Scotland Railway 

Disused railway stations in Aberdeenshire
Former Great North of Scotland Railway stations
Railway stations in Great Britain opened in 1854
Railway stations in Great Britain closed in 1866
1854 establishments in Scotland
1866 disestablishments in the United Kingdom